"Fourth of July" is the colloquial name for Independence Day, a federal holiday in the United States.

Fourth of July or 4th of July may also refer to:
 July 4, the date

Music 
 Fourth of July (band), an American indie band since 2005
 "4th of July" (The Beach Boys song) (1993)
 "4th of July (Fireworks)", a 2010 song by Kelis 
 "4th of July" (Amy Macdonald song) (2012)
 "4th of July" (U2 song) (1984)
 "Fourth of July", a song by Dave Alvin from Romeo's Escape
 "Fourth of July", a song by Mariah Carey from Butterfly
 "Fourth of July", a song by Fall Out Boy from American Beauty/American Psycho
 "Fourth of July", a song by Galaxie 500 from This Is Our Music
 "4th of July", a song by Shooter Jennings from Put the "O" Back in Country
 "4th of July", a song by Soundgarden from Superunknown
 "Fourth of July", a song by Sufjan Stevens from Carrie & Lowell
 "4th of July", a song by X from See How We Are

Places 
 Fourth of July River, a river in Seward, Alaska
 Fourth of July Lake, an alpine lake in Custer County, Idaho
 Fourth of July Summit, a mountain pass in Idaho

Film and television
 "4th of July/Regatta", an episode of Tugs
 July 4 (film), a 2007 Malayalam film
 Fourth of July (film), a 2022 American comedy-drama film

Other uses
 4th of July (novel), a 2005 novel by James Patterson
 Fourth of July tomato, a common cultivar of tomato plants

See also 
 "4th of July, Asbury Park (Sandy)", a song by Bruce Springsteen
 Independence Day (disambiguation)

Date and time disambiguation pages